Iggingen is a municipality in the German state of Baden-Württemberg, in Ostalbkreis district.

Population development
  
1939:	  952
1961:	1.412
1987:	1.959
1997:	2.385
2006:	2.586

Mayor
Klemens Stöckle was elected mayor in 1994, he was reelected in 2002, 2010 and 2018.

References

External links
 

Ostalbkreis